Stoke Prior may refer to:

Stoke Prior, Herefordshire
Stoke Prior, Worcestershire